The Tunjuelo Formation, Río Tunjuelo or Río Tunjuelito Formation (Q1tu, Qpt, Qcc) is a geological formation of the Bogotá savanna, Altiplano Cundiboyacense, Eastern Ranges of the Colombian Andes. The formation consists mainly of conglomerates with intercalating shales and sandstones. It is a formation of the lacustrine and fluvio-glacial sediments of Lake Humboldt.

Etymology 
The formation was first defined and named by Helmens and Van der Hammen in 1995 after the Tunjuelo River, also called Tunjuelito River, of southern Bogotá.

Description

Lithologies 
The Tunjuelo Formation consists mainly of conglomerates with intercalating shales and sandstones.

Stratigraphy and depositional environment 
The Tunjuelo Formation conformably overlies the Marichuela Formation and in other parts the Subachoque Formation. The Tunjuelo Formation is overlain by the thin Chía Formation. The age has been estimated to be Pleistocene based on palynology and radiocarbon dating, covering the Pleistocene from 2.6 to 0.01 Ma. The depositional environment has been interpreted as fluvio-glacial terraces.

Outcrops 

The Tunjuelo Formation is found at its type locality in the Tunjuelo River valley, in the synclinal of Guasca, near Cogua, Cundinamarca, and in the basins of the rivers San Cristóbal, San Francisco, Arzobispo and Subachoque, and the creeks (quebradas) Las Delicias, La Vieja, Rosales and Chicó of the Colombian capital. In the Tunjuelo River valley, the formation is crossed by the northeast-southwest oriented Yerbabuena Fault.

See also 

 Geology of the Eastern Hills
 Geology of the Ocetá Páramo
 Geology of the Altiplano Cundiboyacense

References

Bibliography

Maps

External links 
 

Geologic formations of Colombia
Pleistocene Colombia
Conglomerate formations
Fluvial deposits
Glacial deposits
Formations
Geography of Cundinamarca Department
Geography of Bogotá
Muysccubun